Bryoptera is a genus of moths in the family Geometridae erected by Achille Guenée in 1858.

References

Boarmiini